is a Japanese comedian and television presenter. In 1991 he directed the film Kaze, Slow Down. On August 23, 2011, Shinsuke Shimada announced his retirement after admitting to extensive ties to the yakuza, Japan's organized crime. The yakuza's dominance in the entertainment industry was a subject that has long been a taboo.

See also
 The Deal (Japanese game show)

References

1956 births
Japanese comedians
Japanese film directors
Japanese television personalities
People from Kyoto
Living people
Japanese male actors